Lincoln Township is an inactive township in Dallas County, in the U.S. state of Missouri.

Lincoln Township was established in 1868, taking its name from President Abraham Lincoln.

References

Townships in Missouri
Townships in Dallas County, Missouri